The Sabah FC 2021–22 season was Sabah's fourth Azerbaijan Premier League season, and their fifth season in existence.

Season events
On 27 May, Sabah announced the signing of Elvin Jamalov to a two-year contract from Zira.

On 14 June, Sabah announced the signing of Salahat Aghayev to a one-year contract from Neftçi.

On 8 July, Sabah announced the year-long loan signing of Juan Cámara from Jagiellonia Białystok.

On 10 July, Sabah announced the signing of Joy-Lance Mickels from MVV Maastricht to a two-year contract.

On 2 August, Sabah announced the signing of Ildar Alekperov from Neftekhimik Nizhnekamsk to a three-year contract.

On 4 August, Sabah announced the signing of Mikheil Ergemlidze from Dinamo Tbilisi to a three-year contract.

On 8 August, Sabah announced the signing of Cristian Ceballos from Qatar to a three-year contract.

On 17 August, Sabah announced the signing of Špiro Peričić from Maribor on a one-year contract.

On 14 September, Sabah announced the signing of Petar Škuletić from Montpellier on a two-year contract. Six weeks later, on 27 October, Škuletić left Sabah by mutual consent.

On 21 October, Head Coach Ramin Guliyev resigned from his role with the club bottom of the league. On 30 October, former Krasnodar Head Coach Murad Musayev was appointed as Head Coach on a 2-year contract.

On 16 December, Sabah announced that Saša Stamenković had left the club after his contract was ended by mutual consent.

On 19 January, Sabah announced the signing of Alyaksandr Nyachayew from Rukh Brest.

On 3 February, Sabah announced the signing of Christian from Académica de Coimbra to a 18-month contract. The following day, 4 February, Sabah announced the signing of Higor Gabriel who'd previously played for Fluminense.

On 18 February, Sabah announced the signing of Bojan Letić on a contract until the end of the season.

On 21 March. Sabah announced the signing of Lucas Rangel on loan until the end of the season from Vorskla Poltava.

On 29 March. Sabah announced the signing of Oleksiy Kashchuk on loan until the end of the season from Shakhtar Donetsk.

Squad

Out on loan

Transfers

In

Loans in

Out

Loans out

Released

Friendlies

Competitions

Overview

Premier League

Results summary

Results by round

Results

League table

Azerbaijan Cup

Squad statistics

Appearances and goals

|-
|colspan="14"|Players away on loan:

|-
|colspan="14"|Players who left Sabah during the season:

|}

Goal scorers

Clean sheets

Disciplinary record

References

Sabah FC (Azerbaijan) seasons
Azerbaijani football clubs 2021–22 season